Robert Ellsworth Elliott (January 19, 1901 – after 1959) was a politician in Ontario, Canada. He was a Progressive Conservative member of the Legislative Assembly of Ontario from 1945 to 1948 and from 1951 to 1959. He represented the riding of Hamilton East.

Background
He was born in Allenwood, Ontario and was a general contractor. He married Edith May Homan in 1926 with whom he had two children. He served with the Royal Canadian Engineers for ten years.

Politics
From 1934 to 1945 he served as an alderman on the Hamilton, Ontario City Council. In the 1945 provincial election, he ran as the Progressive Conservative candidate in the riding of Hamilton East. He defeated CCF incumbent Herbert Connor by 2,945 votes.

In the 1948 election he lost to CCF candidate John Dowling but recaptured the riding from Dowling in 1951. He lost the riding in 1959 to CCF candidate Norm Davison by 1,072 votes.

References

External links

1901 births
Year of death missing
Hamilton, Ontario city councillors
Politicians from Simcoe County
Progressive Conservative Party of Ontario MPPs
Canadian military personnel from Ontario
Royal Canadian Engineers soldiers